This is a list of "laws" applied to various disciplines. These are often adages or predictions with the appellation 'Law', although they do not apply in the legal sense, cannot be scientifically tested, or are intended only as rough descriptions (rather than applying in each case). These 'laws' are sometimes called rules of thumb.

See List of legal topics for 'laws' in the legal sense.

See List of scientific laws for falsifiable laws that are said to apply universally and literally.

General
 Benford's law
 Hilt's law
 Stigler's law of eponymy
 Goodhart's law

Astronomy and cosmology
 Hubble's law
 Titius–Bode law
 Dermott's law

Technology
 Amdahl's law (maximum possible speed-up to a parallel program when adding more computing power)
 Bell's law of computer classes (corollary to Moore's law for computer class formation)
 Brooks's law
 Conway's law
 Dennard scaling
 Engelbart's law
 Eroom's law
 Godwin's law (Prediction of internet debating patterns)
 Grosch's law
 Gustafson's law
 Haitz's law – analog to Moore's law for LEDs
 Hick's law
 Kryder's law
 Koomey's law
 Landauer's principle
 Linus's law (software development)
 Metcalfe's law
 Moore's law (hardware development)
 Neven's law
 Reed's law
 Swanson's law
 Wirth's law
Wright's law
 Zimmerman's law

Economic
 Laws of supply and demand
 Gresham's law
 Say's law
 Law of diminishing marginal utility
 Ricardo's law
 Okun's law

Linguistic
 Aitken's Law - synchronic rule in Scottish varieties of English
 Bartholomae's law - regarding historical sound changes in Indo-Iranian
 Bartsch's law - regarding historical sound changes in French
 Brugmann's law - regarding historical sound changes in Indo-Iranian
 Dahl's law - synchronic rule in Bantu languages
 Dorsey's law - synchronic rule in Winnebago
 Grassmann's law - regarding historical sound changes in ancient Greek and Sanskrit
 Grimm's law – regarding historical sound changes in Proto-Germanic
 Hirt's law - regarding historical sound changes in Balto-Slavic
 Osthoff's law - regarding historical sound changes in Indo-European
 Pedersen's law - regarding historical sound changes in Balto-Slavic
 Philippi's law - regarding historical sound changes in Biblical Hebrew
 Verner's law - an exception to Grimm's law
 Wackernagel's law - regarding position of clitics in syntax
 Whorf's law - regarding historical sound changes in Proto-Uto-Aztecan
 Winter's law - regarding historical sound changes in Balto-Slavic
See also Glossary of sound laws in the Indo-European languages

Mathematical
 Law of large numbers

Science fiction authors
 Clarke's three laws
 Niven's laws
 Sturgeon's law
 Three Laws of Robotics (Isaac Asimov's fictional set of laws)
 Wizard's First Rule (law)

Biological
 Bergmann's rule
 Llinás' law
 Briffault's law
 Kleiber's law
 Rensch's rule
 Rubner's law

Related lists
 List of eponymous laws
 List of scientific laws named after people

Society-related lists